Casey Bennetto is an Australian writer, musician, performer and radio broadcaster.

Bennetto was born in 1969 in Mildura, Victoria, and grew up in Greensborough, Melbourne.

He wrote and composed the musical Keating! for the Melbourne International Comedy Festival which later received the 2007 Helpmann Award for Best Musical as well as Best Original Score for Bennetto.

Casey has been co-host on The Conversation Hour with Jon Faine on ABC Local Radio in Melbourne.  He also co-presents the program Superfluity on community radio station 3RRR.  He was a regular guest on television music quiz Spicks and Specks.

References

External links 
 Casey Bennetto on IMDb

1969 births
Helpmann Award winners
Living people
Australian writers
Australian musical theatre composers
People from Mildura
People from Greensborough, Victoria
Musicians from Victoria (Australia)
Writers from Victoria (Australia)
Radio personalities from Melbourne